is a story based on the events of the 1854 Nankai earthquake's tsunami. This story explains the importance of alertness to the tsunami after the earthquake and early evacuation, and the sacrificial spirit for saving lives. 

When the 1854 tsunami, In Hiro (now Hirogawa), Goryo Hamaguchi set fires using rice straw to help guide villagers to safety. This story was turned into "A living god" by the Greek-born writer Lafcadio Hearn. Hamaguchi saved the lives of many of his fellow villagers of Hiro, Kii Province (current Hirogawa, Wakayama), when a massive tsunami struck the Kii Peninsula in 1854. He set fire to stacks of rice sheaves as landmarks to guide villagers to safety. Lafcadio Hearn wrote a story about him in Gleanings in Buddha-Fields: Studies of Hand and Soul in the Far East (1897), called "Inamura no Hi: The burning rice fields".

Overview 
Thanks to the story Inamura no Hi: The Burning Rice Fields by Tsunezo Nakai (translated and published in English by Sara Cone Bryant) and Lafcadio Hearn's Gleanings in Buddha-Fields (1897), Hirogawa (then Hiro-Mura) is often referred to the home of "A Living God": Goryo Hamaguchi (1820-1885).

In 1854, Goryo Hamaguchi saved many lives from the tsunami struck the Kii Peninsula following the big earthquake. He set fires to rice sheaves (inamura) to help guide those in great danger to safety on the hilltop. He also devoted himself to help fellow villagers find jobs (hiring them) and build confidence by constructing a huge seawall. The story chronicled Goryo's heroism and accounts of his efforts were introduced into Japanese textbooks.

Goryo Hamaguchi and others established a private academy called "Taikyu-sha" (current Taikyu Junior/High School) to give the villagers the opportunity to learn. (According to the school record, they are not teaching the way to be successful or be famous but to be practical in many ways, such as farming and ironing.)

In 1907, George Trumbull Ladd, assisting Marquis Ito (Hirofumi), visited the school and later published his journal Rare Days in Japan (1910) in the U.S.

References

External links 

 

Japanese non-fiction books
Disaster books
Tsunami
Hirogawa, Wakayama
1854 in Japan
Works about earthquakes